Gim Myeong-hui (1788-?), also known as Kim Myeong-hui, was a calligrapher of the late Joseon Dynasty.  He was born into a yangban family of the Gyeongju Gim lineage, the son of Gim No-gyeong.  He passed the jinsa literary examination in 1810, and entered government service.  However, he never rose above the rank of hyeon magistrate.  Accompanying his father on a mission to the Qing Dynasty court in 1822, he struck up correspondences with leading Chinese calligraphers of the time, including Liu Xihai (:zh:劉喜海).

Gim's elder brother Gim Jeong-hui was also known for his calligraphy.

Notes

References

See also
Korean culture
Joseon Dynasty
Korean calligraphy

19th-century Korean calligraphers
1788 births
Gim clan of Gyeongju
Year of death missing